Kvemo Qemulta  or Qemult’a   is a settlement in the Dzau district of South Ossetia.  It is located at the confluence of the rivers Keshelti and Patsi (Great Liakhvi basin) on the Tskhinvali-Oni highway. 1600 meters above sea level, 12 kilometers from Java.

History 
In 1921, 20 villages in the Qemulta community belonged to the South Ossetian Revcom. In 1922-90 it was part of the Java district and was the center of the Rural Council for neighboring villages: , Tlia, Nazigina, Saritata, Sokhta, Kotanto, Chitata, and Khikhata. Currently occupied by Russia.

See also
 Dzau district

References 

Populated places in Dzau District